Raybould is a surname. Notable people with the surname include:

Billy Raybould (born 1944), Welsh rugby union player
Clarence Raybould (1886–1972), English conductor, composer and pianist
Dell Raybould, American politician
Elizabeth Raybould, British nurse and writer
Eric Raybould, English footballer
Jane Michele Raybould, Nebraska politician
Jody Wilson-Raybould
John Raybould (born 1934), English cricketer
Ryan Raybould (born 1983), American soccer player
Sam Raybould (1875–1949), English footballer
Tom Raybould (1884–1944), English footballer
William Raybould (c. 1836 – 1886), Canadian miner, merchant and politician

See also